Country club is a private club that offers a variety of recreational sports facilities.

Country club may also refer to:

Geography

United States
Country Club, Bronx, New York, a neighborhood in New York City
Country Club, California, a census-designated place in San Joaquin County
Country Club, Denver, Colorado, a neighborhood of Denver
Country Club, Florida, a census-designated place
 Country Club, Missouri
 Country Club, San Juan, Puerto Rico
Country Club Historic District (disambiguation), various NRHP-listed places

Arts, entertainment, and media

Literature
The Country Club (play), Off-Broadway play

Music
Country Club (album), an album by Travis Tritt
"Country Club" (song), a 1989 song by Travis Tritt
"Country Club", a 1909 ragtime two-step composition by Scott Joplin

Television
Country Club, working title for the Disney animated television series Big City Greens
Country Club (TV series), a 1958 Canadian variety show

Brands and enterprises
Country Club, a malt liquor first produced in the early 1950s by the M.K. Goetz Brewing Company
Country Club Plaza, a shopping district in the American city of Kansas City

Sports venues
Country Club, Harare, a cricket ground based in Harare, formerly known as the Interfin High Performance Academy
Reseda Country Club, a former sports and entertainment venue in Reseda, California 
The Country Club, in Brookline, Massachusetts; a major golf course

Other uses
Country club Republican, a label given to upper-class, moderate Republican Party members